The Skolt of the Year Award is an annual award founded in 2007. It is awarded to people, groups, organizations, and institutions individually or collectively in recognition of their outstanding linguistic and cultural contributions for the good of the Skolt community. In spite of its name, it is not a requirement that the recipient be a Skolt. The award is administered and voted on by the Skolt Sámi Language and Culture Association Saaʹmi Nueʹtt and the Skolt community council.

Recipients

References 

Awards established in 2007
Sámi awards
Language-related awards
Awards for contributions to culture
Skolts